The Sunday Times Rich List 2021 is the 33rd annual survey of the wealthiest people resident in the United Kingdom, published by The Sunday Times online on 21 May 2021.

The List was edited by Robert Watts who succeeded long-term compiler Philip Beresford in 2017. He noted that "the fact many of the super-rich grew so much wealthier at a time when thousands of us have buried loved ones and millions of us worried for our livelihoods makes this a very unsettling boom."

The List was widely reported by other media.

Top 10 fortunes

See also 
 Forbes list of billionaires

References

External links 
 Sunday Times Rich List

Sunday Times Rich List
2021 in the United Kingdom